The Invasion was a professional wrestling storyline in the World Wrestling Federation (WWF, now known as WWE) during the Attitude Era that ran from March–November 2001 and involved stables of wrestlers purporting to represent World Championship Wrestling (WCW) and Extreme Championship Wrestling (ECW)—which merged to form The Alliance—placed against a stable of wrestlers purporting to represent the WWF. The storyline began shortly after the WWF's acquisitions of WCW and ECW in March and April 2001, respectively, and concluded with a "winner takes all" match between The Alliance and the WWF at Survivor Series.

The idea of a supercard featuring the two top promotions of the Monday Night Wars was considered to be a dream match scenario in the eyes of many fans, as it would allow the fans to see which promotion would be superior in storyline. The angle began when Mr. McMahon's son, Shane McMahon, announced as part of the storyline on WWF's Raw Is War and the final episode of WCW's Nitro (which merged into a simulcast) that he had bought WCW from under his father's nose. This led to several run-in appearances of WCW wrestlers during Raw Is War and SmackDown! over the months after WrestleMania X-Seven.

In June 2001, the angle grew in intensity as the WWF storylines somewhat abated to make room for the central Invasion storyline. WCW and ECW merged to form The Alliance and challenged the WWF's control over the wrestling industry. An Inaugural Brawl took place at the WWF Invasion pay-per-view, where Stone Cold Steve Austin defected and joined The Alliance. Many inter-promotional matches occurred after the Invasion between The Alliance and the WWF, leading up to the climax of the angle at Survivor Series, when Team WWF (The Rock, Chris Jericho, Big Show, The Undertaker and Kane) defeated Team Alliance (Stone Cold Steve Austin, Kurt Angle, Rob Van Dam, Booker T and Shane McMahon) in a Winner Take All elimination tag team match.

The angle saw financial success for the WWF, with the WWF Invasion pay-per-view garnering a buyrate of 770,000. Despite its commercial success, the angle received mixed reviews following its conclusion, and is generally historically considered a major disappointment by fans and critics.

History

Monday Night Wars: The Genesis 

During the Monday Night Wars, the WWF and WCW, the two top North American wrestling promotions, competed for ratings. Through developments such as the creation of the New World Order (nWo) and the Montreal Screwjob, fans continually compared the two promotions.

Among other factors, however, mismanagement within WCW eventually led WCW to a downward spiral from which it never recovered. The Monday Night Wars came to an end on March 23, 2001, when the WWF bought the rights to WCW's video library, trademarks, 24 contracts for selected wrestlers, championships, and other properties for what was considered to be a lower bargain price.

The final night of the Monday Night Wars occurred on March 26, 2001: Raw Is War primarily focused on the major storylines heading into WrestleMania X-Seven, while Nitro held their final episode with a "Night of Champions". Mr. McMahon opened up Nitro and announced a simulcast later that night to address the future of WCW. Throughout Raw Is War, McMahon publicly named several WCW wrestlers who would not be retained. Though most would wrestle for the WWE in the ensuing years, he did legitimately fire Jeff Jarrett on television due to animosity between the two dating back in 1999, when Jarrett blackmailed McMahon for payment after he was booked for a match at No Mercy following his contract expiry the day before. After Sting defeated Ric Flair in WCW's final match, the simulcast began. McMahon talked about the buyout of WCW and toyed with the idea of making WCW into a huge media conglomerate, much like the WWF. He asked the crowd who he should keep under his belt by mentioning names of WCW wrestlers and asking for a reaction. Lex Luger and Hulk Hogan received a negative reaction from fans, and Buff Bagwell, Booker T, Scott Steiner, Sting, and Goldberg received positive reactions. Vince then proceeded to fire them all, however, to the cheers of the Raw Is War crowd and the jeers of the Nitro crowd. McMahon then announced that he would sign the contract and make the purchase official at WrestleMania, on the condition that Ted Turner brings the contract for McMahon to sign personally. Shane McMahon, however, appeared on Nitro and announced in kayfabe that he had signed the contract and purchased WCW out from under his father's nose, planting the seed for what was considered a lucrative future storyline opportunity. The Invasion did not begin immediately afterwards, as the WWF was preparing for WrestleMania X-Seven, the year's largest show, which was mere days away.

Invasion: WCW's First Strike 

The WWF had effectively doubled the size of its roster through its acquisition of WCW, and as a result, there was not enough screen time for everyone. The original plan was to find a time slot on TNN (renamed to Spike TV, now known as Paramount Network) to continue running WCW as a separate entity. Polls were even put up on WWF.com and WCW.com to decide the name of the new show. These plans fell through when no television station would touch WCW because of its reputation for losing money. The WWF eventually carried out a brand extension, effectively reviving WCW under its own auspices and running two separate promotions, each with one of the WWF's two existing televised shows, Raw and SmackDown!.

As part of its plans, Lance Storm became the first WCW wrestler to appear on WWF programming, by performing a run-in during a match on the May 28 episode of Raw Is War. Hugh Morrus made his WWF debut on the June 4 episode of Raw Is War by attacking Edge. At King of the Ring on June 24, then-WCW wrestler Booker T interfered during the triple threat main event match for the WWF Championship and almost cost Stone Cold Steve Austin the title. Additionally, Austin legitimately suffered fractured bones in his hand from the side slam he took from Booker T into an announce table. The next night on Raw Is War, which was held in New York City's Madison Square Garden, a confrontation occurred between WCW owner Shane McMahon and WWF owner Vince McMahon. While Vince was in the ring, Booker T came from behind to deliver his finishing move, a scissor kick, to Vince. The WWF roster ran to the ring to aid Vince, but Booker T and Shane McMahon escaped through the crowd. This incident marked the official start of the Invasion storyline; Raw Is War commentator Jim Ross announced, "The battle lines have been drawn!"
WCW Tag Team Champions Chuck Palumbo and Sean O'Haire then made their WWF debuts on June 28, 2001, by invading SmackDown! and attacking the Hardy Boyz and Dudley Boyz during a tag team match, before fleeing after WWF wrestlers came after them in the ring. 
As they were exiting the arena, they were attacked from behind by other WWF wrestlers led by Hardcore Holly and the APA, preventing what happened with the previous WCW wrestlers running to the arena exits undisturbed and rushing them back into the ring, where they were beaten up by WWF wrestlers.

The WWF eventually began to recognize WCW and tested the idea of a brand extension by giving WCW the final twenty minutes of the July 2 episode of Raw Is War, with Scott Hudson and Arn Anderson as the announcers in place of Jim Ross and Paul Heyman. During a match between Buff Bagwell and Booker T for the WCW Championship, WWF wrestlers Kurt Angle and then WWF Champion Stone Cold Steve Austin interfered in retaliation by beating Booker T up, with Bagwell joining Angle and Austin by attacking Booker T. This match was poorly received by the audience in attendance at the Tacoma Dome in Tacoma, Washington; sports journalist Michael Landsberg reported that many have called the bout "the worst match ever". One source cited that the match should have showcased the best of WCW, but instead featured too many restholds and not enough action. The audience jeered the wrestlers with chants of "This match sucks!" and "Boring!" A WWF source close to Vince McMahon said that he "absolutely hated" the segment. In a podcast interview with Stone Cold Steve Austin in 2015, Bagwell expressed his suspicions of the WWF's true plans for the WCW product, stating his confusion as to why his match with Booker T took place in Tacoma, Washington (very much a pro-WWF area) instead of on the following week's Raw Is War show at the Philips Arena in Atlanta (the former headquarters city of WCW), where the match likely would have received a more positive fan reception.

Up until this point, the WCW contingent were being built up to being malcontent faces rising up against the heel Vince McMahon, because of Vince's bluster during the final Nitro broadcast and Shane's usurping of the WCW ownership. Originally, WCW talents were meant to attack strictly heel WWF wrestlers. The strongly negative reaction of the core WWF viewership to the WCW product and talent, however, coupled with the reality that a WCW wrestling program tailored to appeal to WWF fans would not come to fruition, led to the entire WCW contingent being abruptly turned heel. One example was the heel gimmick of then WCW Alliance member Diamond Dallas Page, whose first WWF appearance was built up over several weeks in a storyline in which he was portrayed as an anonymous stalker sending invasive videotapes to then-babyface, The Undertaker.

Addition of ECW: The Formation of The Alliance 

On the July 9 episode of Raw Is War at Philips Arena in Atlanta, Georgia, Kane was scheduled to face Mike Awesome and Lance Storm in a handicap match. Chris Jericho came out and offered to be Kane's partner, thus turning it into a tag team match. Near the end of the match, Jericho applied the Walls of Jericho on Lance Storm. As the move was being applied, however, Rob Van Dam and Tommy Dreamer ran through the audience and into the ring and started to beat on Kane and Jericho. In response, WWF wrestlers consisting of The Dudley Boyz, Tazz, Justin Credible, Rhyno, and Raven (all former ECW wrestlers) ran to the ring. After a brief stand-off, the WWF cavalry turned around and attacked Kane and Jericho. This prompted Paul Heyman to leave the announce table and enter the ring. After high-fiving the wrestlers, he announced that ECW has been brought into the Invasion. Heyman talked about how tired he was sitting beside Jim Ross and discussing WCW vs. WWF, stating that he felt that everyone had forgotten about ECW and announced, "This Invasion just got taken to the extreme!".

Later during the night, Shane and Vince McMahon bumped into each other backstage. Shane told his father that ECW needed to be taken care of and pointed out that there were ten ECW wrestlers under Heyman's belt. He suggested that WWF and WCW field five wrestlers each to take out ECW; Vince agreed, but he stubbornly insisted that WCW would eventually meet its demise when all was said and done.

At the end of the night, the WCW wrestlers came into the ring, accompanied by Shane McMahon. The WWF wrestlers then came into the ring and, before ECW entered, the WCW and WWF wrestlers started to brawl. The WWF wrestlers cleared the ring, but then were stormed by the ECW wrestlers and taken out. The WCW wrestlers came into the ring, high-fived the ECW men and then dismantled the WWF wrestlers as Paul Heyman and Shane McMahon hugged in triumph. Upon seeing a stunned Vince McMahon asking what was going on, Shane admitted being responsible for all the events that just transpired and announced that ECW and WCW merged to form The Alliance – with Stephanie McMahon as ECW's new owner.

Stone Cold Steve Austin's exile and return 

Stone Cold Steve Austin, who had turned heel at WrestleMania and formed an alliance with McMahon when he helped Austin win the WWF Championship, took a change in character during this time. Instead of being a beer-drinking redneck, he was more emotional and tried to cheer-up Vince McMahon, who was clearly stressed from the threat of The Alliance, by doing something generous like giving Vince a cowboy hat as a present. On the July 12 episode of SmackDown!, Austin played "Kumbaya" and "We Are the Champions" for McMahon, to which Vince was unresponsive. Later that night, Vince McMahon came out and asked Austin to come to the ring, announcing him as the man that would lead Team WWF into the pay-per-view and into victory. Upon entering, Vince McMahon told Austin that he had changed quite a bit since WrestleMania, and when the WWF goes up against The Alliance at the upcoming pay-per-view, he did not need an Austin that gave him hugs and gifts and baked him cookies. He needed the "old" Stone Cold who was a "beer-swilling, foul-mouthed SOB" and the "old" Stone Cold that "didn't take shit from anyone". He asked Austin to knock him down, even yelling to the crowd, "If you want Stone Cold to beat the living hell out of Vince McMahon, give me a hell yeah!" to which the crowd responded enthusiastically. Austin, however, shook his head and proceeded to leave the ring, turning his back on Vince McMahon. Later that night when Diamond Dallas Page and Shane McMahon went up against the Undertaker and Kurt Angle, many members of the Alliance interfered. Kane and Jericho came to help their team, but the Alliance's numbers were too many, and without Austin to back up his teammates, Team WWF was overwhelmed.

On the July 16 episode of Raw Is War, Austin was shown drinking and playing pool at a bar downtown. During the night, Vince McMahon held a WWF meeting backstage. Undertaker and the APA gave a motivational speech on how they should not tolerate the Alliance any longer. After they were finished, Brooklyn Brawler wheeled Freddie Blassie into the room so he could address the wrestlers and pump them up for the night. As the WWF wrestlers united, Austin could be seen watching the events on the television at the bar. He proceeded to slam his cue stick on the pool table and left.

Later that night, DDP and Rhyno faced Kane and the Undertaker. During the match, there was interference from the Alliance. In response, The Hardy Boyz, the APA, Jericho, and Kurt Angle came to help their WWF allies, but more Alliance members came in and overwhelmed the WWF wrestlers. Backstage, many WWF and Alliance wrestlers were fighting each other, and the WWF seemed to be on the losing end of things. A truck was seen driving up to the arena, however, and Austin came out with his cue stick and proceeded to beat down any WCW and ECW wrestlers in his path. He then came to the ring, trash-talking on the way down, and beat down the Alliance wrestlers, giving Stunners to most of the men in the ring. The WWF wrestlers had cleaned house and were standing tall. The WWF seemed to be in good shape for the upcoming pay-per-view with Austin's return.

InVasion: WWF vs The Alliance (WCW/ECW): The War Begins 

At InVasion, the Inaugural Brawl took place between Team WCW/ECW and Team WWF. Team WWF consisted of Stone Cold Steve Austin, Kurt Angle, Chris Jericho, Kane, and the Undertaker, who all squared off against the team of Diamond Dallas Page, Booker T, Rhyno, and the Dudley Boyz. Near the end of the match, all of the wrestlers were outside of the ring except Booker T and Angle. Angle applied the ankle lock on Booker T, who tapped out, but no referee was there to witness it. Austin then dragged a referee into the ring, but in a swerve, kicked Angle in the head, hit him with a Stunner, and placed Booker T on top of Angle and told the referee to count. Team WCW/ECW won the match due to Austin's betrayal of the WWF.

The next night, Austin claimed he joined the Alliance because they appreciated him. He cited Vince's hugging of Angle and calling The Rock on the phone as signs that Vince did not appreciate Austin and accused McMahon of grooming Angle to be the next WWF Champion.

WWF gains momentum: The Return of The Rock 

On the July 26 episode of SmackDown!, Shane McMahon extended an invitation to The Rock, who had not been seen since the Raw Is War following WrestleMania X-Seven, to join the Alliance. Also that night, Kurt Angle challenged Booker T to a WCW Championship match, which Booker T accepted. The WWF gained momentum when Angle made Booker T submit with an ankle lock, taking the WCW Championship away from the Alliance. Angle's title run proved to be short-lived, as Booker T won it back on the July 30 episode of Raw Is War.

On that same Raw Is War at the First Union Center in Philadelphia, The Rock returned for the first time since his kayfabe suspension (in reality, he was given the "suspension" to take time off to film The Scorpion King) on the April 2 episode of Raw Is War. Shane, Stephanie, and Vince McMahon were in the ring that night, trying to convince The Rock to join them. Shane reminded The Rock of how Vince screwed him out of the WWF Championship earlier in the year at WrestleMania and also in a steel cage match the day after WrestleMania. Vince conceded that it was wrong for him to back Austin, as he was a rattlesnake that he should have known would eventually bite him. He promised The Rock that he had no intention of screwing him if he returned to the WWF but also noted that he could not promise that he never would; if it was good for business, he said, then he just might do it. He told The Rock that he was at least being honest with him and pleaded for The Rock to trust himself, stating that his future was with the fans and the WWF. The Rock gave Vince a Rock Bottom after some bickering between Shane and Vince, and proceeded to stare down Shane, then smile cheekily and shake Shane's hand, faking a defection to the Alliance and a heel turn – but he then proceeded to Rock Bottom him as well and give him a People's Elbow, before emphatically asserting, "Finally, the Rock has come back... to the WWF," thus aligning himself with the World Wrestling Federation.

His return led to a WCW Championship match between The Rock and Booker T at SummerSlam, which The Rock won, marking the second time the WCW Championship belt changed sides to the WWF. At that same pay-per-view, Austin retained his WWF Championship against Angle after Angle won by disqualification.

The following Raw Is War and SmackDown! showings featured primarily interpromotional matches between the two companies, with one notable match being a singles match between Chris Jericho and Hugh Morrus on the August 9 episode of SmackDown! in which the match ended with Jericho picking up the victory with a submission on Morrus, however Rhyno performed a post-match attack on Jericho in which Rhyno delivered his finishing move 'The Gore' to Jericho which in turn destroyed a small portion of the stage design (the following week on the August 16 episode of SmackDown! would lead to the debut of the fist stage design in response to the destruction of the oval stage design). On the August 27 episode of Raw Is War, Austin stole Kurt Angle's medals, and on the August 30 episode of SmackDown!, tied them to a cinder block and threw them in a river. On the following September 3 episode of Raw Is War, Debra and Stephanie bought a new truck for Austin, but Angle came up from behind and nailed Austin in the back of the head with a pipe. He put a cinder block and rope in the truck, put Austin in it, and drove away on the truck. He blindfolded Austin and threatened to throw him into a river if he did not get a title shot. Austin, fearful for his life, "broke down in tears" and agreed to give Angle a title shot at the upcoming pay-per-view, Unforgiven. Angle said, however, that Austin was "still going into the water", but instead simply embarrassed Austin by throwing him into a kiddie pool.

On September 11, 2001, four aircraft were hijacked and crashed into New York City and Washington, D.C. As a result, the Invasion storyline has been temporarily paused on the September 13 live episode of SmackDown! held in Houston, two days after the attacks, when the Alliance and the WWF wrestlers joined in solidarity where Vince McMahon gave a speech and ring announcer Lillian Garcia sang The Star-Spangled Banner.

The WWF gained even more momentum at Unforgiven, as The Rock retained the WCW Championship in a handicap match against Booker T and Shane McMahon, and Kurt Angle made Austin submit to the ankle lock, winning the WWF Championship from Austin, putting both belts into the hands of the WWF.

Almost every other championship had changed hands during this period of time, being exchanged between WWF Superstars and Alliance members. For example, The Undertaker and Kane beat Diamond Dallas Page and Chris Kanyon in a steel cage match at SummerSlam to become co-holders of both the WWF and WCW Tag Team titles. Also, X-Pac beat Billy Kidman to become double champion of WWF Light Heavyweight Champion as well as WCW Cruiserweight Champion.

The Chris Jericho/The Rock Feud: The Alliance Comeback 

There were several interpromotional matches after Unforgiven. Furthermore, a crucial plot point formed when, on the October 8 airing of Raw, Jericho and The Rock teamed up against Shane McMahon and Rob Van Dam. During the match, Jericho mistakenly struck The Rock with a steel chair, costing them the match. The Rock confronted Jericho backstage after the match, leading to a brawl between the two. The two of them began a feud, although they often tagged together, had similar gimmicks of hurling comedic insults at Stephanie McMahon, and at one point won the WWF Tag Team Championship.

Also that night, Steve Austin and Kurt Angle faced off for the WWF Championship, and then-WWF Commissioner William Regal, who sat at ringside to ensure a fair match would take place, hit Kurt Angle with the belt, thereby backstabbing the WWF and costing Angle the title. On the following October 11 episode of SmackDown!, Linda McMahon promptly fired Regal from his position as WWF Commissioner, and named Mick Foley as his replacement. Regal, himself a former WCW employee, was then declared the Commissioner of the Alliance by Shane and Stephanie.

The feud between Jericho and The Rock built up to a match at No Mercy on October 21, where Jericho beat the Rock to win the WCW Championship (Jericho's first world title), and Steve Austin defeated Angle and Rob Van Dam to retain his WWF Championship.

On the October 29 episode of Raw, Shane McMahon told his father, Vince McMahon, that a member of the WWF would jump ship to the Alliance that night. Later that same night, Kurt Angle backstabbed the WWF by hitting Jericho, The Rock, Undertaker, and Kane with steel chairs. On the following episode of SmackDown! on November 1, Angle, who originally led the WWF wrestlers, explained that he represented what is great about America—he was a winner, and his defection came from his decision to fight along the winning side. That side included Steve Austin, a man Angle claimed knew how to win.

End of the invasion: Survivor Series 2001 

On the November 5 airing of Raw, Vince McMahon countered Kurt Angle's defection by stating that a member of Team Alliance would defect during a match at the upcoming Survivor Series. Steve Austin came out to confront Vince about it, and Vince stated that Austin would be the one to defect. Because of this announcement, many Alliance members began to distrust Austin, who vehemently denied the charges and called Vince a liar. Austin went on to interrogate members of Team Alliance, questioning Booker T and sitting Rob Van Dam down in a room with a light shining on him. That same night The Rock won the WCW Championship from Chris Jericho, but Jericho assaulted The Rock in the ring following the match.

All of this led to a Winner Take All match at Survivor Series, which pitted Team WWF (The Rock, Chris Jericho, The Undertaker, Kane, and Big Show) against Team Alliance (Stone Cold Steve Austin, Kurt Angle, Booker T, Rob Van Dam, and Shane McMahon). The final three men in the match were The Rock and Jericho vs. Austin. Jericho was eliminated and, to continue the feud between the two men, attacked The Rock with a Breakdown, even though Jericho's future was on the line if The Rock lost. The Rock and Austin continued to battle it out, each stealing and reversing their signature maneuvers and the referee was knocked down in the match. Austin Stone Cold Stunnered the Rock and pinned him, but there was no referee to count it. Austin approached the downed referee to try to revive him. As this was occurring, Angle ran to the ring, picked up the WWF Championship belt, and nailed Austin with it, revealing himself to be the defector to which McMahon was referring to the entire time. The Rock got up to his feet and followed this with a Rock Bottom and a pin on Austin, to which the referee woke up and groggily counted the three count. Team WWF prevailed, thus ending the storyline.

It was also on this night that several titles were unified; Edge defeated Test to unify the WCW United States Championship and the WWF Intercontinental Championship, while The Dudley Boyz beat The Hardy Boyz in a Steel Cage match to unify the WCW Tag Team Championship with the WWF Tag Team Championship. The final ECW member, Jazz, made her debut during a Six Pack Challenge for the vacant WWF Women's Championship, which was won by Trish Stratus.

Aftermath

Fallout after Survivor Series 
Alliance member Test won a battle royal at Survivor Series that featured both Alliance and WWF wrestlers battling for the right to be immune from termination for a year. Over the next several weeks Test began using that immunity to his advantage, attacking and bullying other wrestlers for no reason and often assaulting referees. Whenever he would be called on it, he would bring up his immunity from being fired. Shortly after Survivor Series however, this was eventually forgotten.

The immunity was also extended to any Alliance member who held a championship at the conclusion of Survivor Series. Stone Cold Steve Austin, who was the WWF Champion, The Dudley Boyz, who held the tag team championships; Rob Van Dam, who was the Hardcore Champion, Billy Kidman, who was the Cruiserweight Champion, and Christian, who was European Champion also saw that extended to them. Of these wrestlers, everyone except RVD (who was already cheered by fans despite being in the Alliance) remained a heel after the Alliance. Also receiving immunity was Stacy Keibler, the manager of the Dudleys, and Tazz, who was a commentator on SmackDown! and had been kicked out of the Alliance several weeks prior.

On the Raw the night after Survivor Series, WWF Commissioner Mick Foley resigned. Vince McMahon celebrated his (assumed) complete and sole ownership of the WWF and his final victory over the Alliance, going on a power trip the entire night. His power trip included kayfabe firing the Alliance's Paul Heyman from his broadcasting position and replaced him with a returning Jerry Lawler, who had been absent from the company since February. He later had his daughter, Stephanie McMahon, escorted from the building by security (with his son, Shane McMahon, leaving the arena on his own accord). Stephanie would return to WWF television again the following month whilst as Shane made a small brief appearance on the July 15, 2002 episode of Raw and would then return to television again in March 2003. Perhaps Vince McMahon's most egotistical move during this power trip was making Alliance commissioner William Regal become the inaugural member of the infamous Kiss My Ass Club in order to retain his job.

McMahon also announced that he would strip Alliance leader Steve Austin of his WWF Championship and would reward it to Kurt Angle, who earlier that night had portrayed himself as the hero of Survivor Series the entire night and bragged about his actions in an egotistical matter to other face wrestlers, to which they all gave him negative reactions. This led to an upset Angle telling McMahon that nobody thanked him and appreciated him for his actions the previous night, which then McMahon had told Angle that he would be honored to reward him the WWF Championship. In doing so, McMahon completed a slow heel turn he had begun at the beginning of the night.

Before McMahon could announce Angle as his new champion, Ric Flair (who was making his return to the WWF after leaving in January 1993) announced that he "bet on a winner" at Survivor Series. When pressed, Flair revealed to McMahon that he was not in fact the sole owner of the WWF as he had originally thought. When Shane McMahon and Stephanie McMahon had bought WCW and ECW earlier in the year they had sold their shares in the WWF to "a consortium", and that Flair was the man who had bought them, making him half-owner of the WWF.

Immediately after making the declaration Austin made his return and attacked Angle for costing him the win at Survivor Series against The Rock and also attacked Vince McMahon for attempting to strip him of his title, ending the heel run he had begun at WrestleMania. He turned face by aligning himself with Flair and reclaiming his WWF Championship belt.

WCW 

After The Alliance was disbanded, the WWF was faced with a title crisis; that is, they had too many championships (due to them acquiring all of WCW's championships), and each individual title became devalued. To combat this, the WWF began to unify many championships. Survivor Series saw two title unification matches: WCW United States Champion Edge defeated Test to become the WWF Intercontinental Champion, retiring the US title, while WCW World Tag Team Champions The Dudley Boyz defeated The Hardy Boyz to win the WWF Tag Team Championships, retiring the WCW tag titles. The following month at Vengeance, the WCW Championship (simply renamed the World Championship after Survivor Series) was unified with the WWF Championship in which Chris Jericho became the champion by defeating both The Rock and Steve Austin in a three-match tournament to form the Undisputed WWF Championship, which continued the lineage of the WWF Championship, while the former World Championship was retired. Another WCW championship, the WCW Cruiserweight Championship, was rebranded as a WWF title (and later, WWE) and replaced the WWF Light Heavyweight Championship.

The Undisputed Championship was originally represented by both the original WWF and WCW title belts, and the champion would carry both belts around until it was replaced with a single belt the following year on the April 1 edition of Raw. At the beginning of the WWE brand extension, the Undisputed Champion would appear on both Raw and SmackDown! until then-champion Brock Lesnar signed an exclusive deal with SmackDown! after his victory over The Rock at SummerSlam 2002, thus making the championship exclusive to the brand. In response, then-Raw General Manager Eric Bischoff introduced the World Heavyweight Championship, represented by the former WCW/World Championship belt, and awarded it to Triple H, who was the number one contender for the Undisputed title. The Undisputed Championship would be renamed the WWE Championship, as it was no longer undisputed as there were two world championships in the promotion. On the June 19, 2003 edition of SmackDown!, the United States Championship was revived as a SmackDown!-exclusive title, thus becoming the WWE United States Championship (and counterpart to Raw's Intercontinental title)—it is the only active title currently in the WWE to not have originated in the promotion.

Although the WWF acquired all of WCW's championships, several were never used following the purchase of WCW, such as the WCW Cruiserweight Tag Team Championship and the WCW World Television Championship, which was quietly retired a year before WCW went out of business. Jim Ross made a passing mention of the WCW Hardcore Championship at WWF Invasion when mentioning all the titles Lance Storm had held in WCW, but the title never appeared during the storyline.

ECW 

Although Tazz briefly appeared on WWF television with the ECW World Heavyweight Championship in 2000 (while under contract with the WWF) after reigning ECW World Heavyweight Champion Mike Awesome unexpectedly signed with WCW, none of ECW's titles were shown on WWF television during the Invasion angle due to ECW's assets being held up in bankruptcy court; the WWE eventually purchased ECW's assets in 2003. Although the WCW brand effectively died once and for all following the end of the Invasion storyline, ECW was temporarily revived by WWE in 2005 for the purposes of a special reunion show, ECW One Night Stand, held on June 12, 2005. The build-up to this one-shot event featured former ECW talent putting over the virtues of the brand versus the WWE product and appearances by several former ECW wrestlers not under contract to WWE. In 2006, it was announced that WWE would be reviving ECW as its third brand (to complement Raw and SmackDown!). The second One Night Stand, held on June 11, 2006, led to the official debut of the new ECW the following Tuesday. Rob Van Dam was awarded the ECW World Heavyweight Championship for his victory in winning the WWE Championship over John Cena, thus officially reviving the title for the ECW brand, as well as the only wrestler to hold the ECW and WWE titles simultaneously. This was the only ECW title to be reactivated by WWE for the ECW brand. The brand would continue to operate until February 2010, when it was announced by Vince McMahon that ECW would be replaced by a developmental series for new talent entitled WWE NXT, which eventually took the place of Florida Championship Wrestling as WWE's developmental brand. The ECW Championship was retired along with the closure of the brand.

Reception 
The Invasion angle was a large storyline that spanned for almost half of 2001 and brought about financial success for the WWF, such as the InVasion pay-per-view being one of the highest non-major event buyrates in the history of pay-per-views. However, the Invasion storyline has come under criticism by wrestling fans and wrestling media, with the storyline being called a flop. Other media refer to the storyline as "one of the most poorly handled, ego-filled storylines in wrestling history".

Weakness of The Alliance 
Throughout the storyline, many interpromotional matches had WWF wrestlers winning over WCW/ECW wrestlers, usually cleanly. In contrast, most of the Alliance's wins were controversial due to interference or disqualification. For example, it took Tazz assisting Raven at InVasion to beat William Regal. The Rock, however, won cleanly at SummerSlam, despite Shane McMahon's assistance to Booker T. A few other critics also noticed the overemphasis on Steve Austin. Critics believed that Austin was the only credible superstar in the Alliance.

One particular example of this was during the Inaugural Brawl at the InVasion pay-per-view. Besides Austin's turn in the match that was needed to secure a WCW/ECW win over the WWF, SLAM! Wrestling alleged that the Alliance wrestled poorly in comparison to the WWF wrestlers: Portrayed as disorganized and inferior grapplers, the ECW-WCW Team had more than its fair share of mistimed moves which hurt their own team members while the "WWF squad" of course wrestled like a well-oiled machine. The weakening of the ECW-WCW dubbed superstars didn't stop there either. The WWF faction battered their enemy tag partners off the ring apron over and over again making them appear weak and more times than not, the ECW-WCW grapplers gained an advantage only by double-teaming or employing underhanded tactics. The message sent was loud and clear. The "best" of ECW-WCW is not good enough to hang with the WWF.

It has been speculated that the reason for this was because Vince McMahon did not want the WWF to look weak while fighting the Alliance, as he worked very hard to put down his competition, especially WCW. Smash Wrestling alleges that WWF wrestlers needed to defect to make the Alliance appear to be a credible threat.

Overemphasis on the McMahons 
The Invasion storyline was presented with a backdrop of a McMahon feud. In the storyline, the WWF was owned by Vince McMahon, WCW was owned by Shane McMahon, and ECW was owned by Stephanie McMahon. Although the feud did not center completely around the McMahons, the family feud storyline had been done many times before. In addition to this, the Steve Austin versus Vince McMahon feud was to start again when Vince McMahon hit Austin in the back of the head with a chair at No Mercy. As stated by a SLAM! Wrestling synopsis of No Mercy: For fans who didn't catch it the fifth, tenth or twentieth time they've run the angle, "Stone Cold" Steve Austin and Vince McMahon are about to feud once again... First up was Vincent McMahon labelling Austin with a steel chair as he was waiting to put a dazed RVD away... Three minutes later, it was Shane McMahon's turn to hurl Kurt Angle out of the ring and into a steel ring post. Vince tackled Shane over the announce table and the two began pummeling one another. Back in the ring, Austin laid a "Stone Cold" Stunner on to retain the belt as a disgruntled Vince scowled. Gee, how many times have we seen that scenario play itself out before? Austin wins. Vince fumes. Fans snore. Whatever.

The storyline also allegedly centered too much on the McMahons, who were getting more airtime than the wrestlers.

Lack of big-name WCW talent, overemphasis on WWF defectors and issues with ECW 

Many fans had dreamed of a day where they could pit WWF and WCW wrestlers against each other, but the storyline's final match ended with four WWF wrestlers brawling it out. On TSN's Off the Record, host Michael Landsberg asked Booker T why the Invasion – which he stated should have been one of the biggest money angles in wrestling history – was in his words a failure on pay-per-view. Booker responded: That wasn't the true WCW. I mean, we didn't have guys like Goldberg. We didn't have Sting. We didn't have Kevin Nash. We didn't have all the major players in the WCW to face the WWF superstars.

Some of the WCW wrestlers' absences were out of the WWF's control. Many of WCW's top wrestlers had contracts with AOL Time Warner, WCW's parent company, and were willing to sit at home rather than wrestle for less money; Booker T, the reigning WCW Champion at the time of WWF's purchase, was a notable exception, agreeing to a buyout of the remainder of his contract with AOL Time Warner in order to wrestle for the WWF immediately. McMahon had the option of taking on any contract he wanted with his purchase, but chose to let AOL Time Warner continue to pay out what were considered bad deals. Ric Flair and Rey Mysterio were not signed until the end of the Invasion because they were tied to their contracts, and therefore their absence was out of the WWF's control. In addition, Scott Steiner was recovering from an injury, while WWF officials were concerned about Steiner's unprofessional backstage behavior. Others, such as Hulk Hogan, Kevin Nash, Scott Hall, and Goldberg, were not signed until well after the storyline finished. As for WCW's other top superstars, Sting was still under contract to AOL Time Warner, and did not join the now-WWE until late 2014, while Lex Luger and Randy Savage would never reappear in the company on television (in May 2011, Luger rejoined WWE in a backstage role related to the company's Wellness Program, while Savage died of a sudden heart attack later the same month). Bret Hart, who made his name in the WWF but was last seen wrestling for WCW, had retired from wrestling due to his concussion he suffered in a match with Goldberg at Starrcade 1999 and estranged from Vince McMahon after the 1997 Montreal Screwjob; he would eventually return to WWE in 2010, having been inducted to the WWE Hall of Fame in 2006. Jeff Jarrett, despite his contract being dealt with WCW rather than AOL Time Warner, was another missing name as he was legitimately and publicly fired during the Raw/Nitro finale simulcast owing to disputes between Jarrett and McMahon that was not settled until 2018. Fans were confused by McMahon's decisions seeing as the WWF would make more than enough to cover all these wrestlers contracts in 2001. Because of this, the WWF's opponent allegedly lacked the strong identity of WCW.

In correlation with WCW, ECW was also missing most of their key superstars such as The Sandman, Sabu, Balls Mahoney, Little Guido and Tony Mamaluke (all of whom would later join WWE's relaunched ECW). Other wrestlers such as Shane Douglas, Masato Tanaka, Terry Funk, New Jack, 2 Cold Scorpio and Mikey Whipwreck would also be missing from the storyline. During that period, the usage of the ECW name on-air was subjected to dispute despite Heyman still technically owning the company while the WWF faced legal action by Harry Slash & The Slashtones for the use of its theme song "This Is Extreme!".

The WWF itself would be missing some of its biggest stars, most notably Triple H, who tore his left quadriceps muscle on the May 21 episode of Raw Is War, weeks before the start of the storyline and would not return until the following year on the January 7 episode of Raw, however he did not compete as an in-ring competitor until the January 17 episode of SmackDown! in a tag team match and would also go on to win the Royal Rumble match a few days later at the Royal Rumble, well after the Invasion angle ended. Shawn Michaels, who was under a four-year retirement at the time, was on hiatus from WWF and also did not appear during the Invasion storyline. Rikishi (shoulder) and Big Boss Man were inactive throughout the entire storyline, and both men did not return to the WWF until December 2001. Eddie Guerrero and Chris Benoit who were former WCW/ECW stars, working for WWF at the time, were also absent from the storyline. Benoit was hinted to defect to WCW before his injury in June 2001 at King of the Ring. Guerrero was also hinted to defect to WCW but was sent to rehabilitation after an addiction with painkillers in May 2001 before being released that November. Both Guerrero and Benoit would not return to the company until April and May 2002 respectively. Dean Malenko and Perry Saturn, who were Benoit and Guerrero's former stablemates from The Radicalz were also absent from the storyline as well, with Malenko officially retiring from professional wrestling in July 2001 while Saturn was involved in a shoot incident during a Jakked/Metal taping and was minimally involved in the storyline; whenever Saturn appeared on match cards during the storyline, it is indicated that he is aligned with the WWF side.

To bolster the ranks of WCW (in lieu of big WCW names), some WWF wrestlers (such as Steve Austin) defected and joined the Alliance and were pushed as the leaders of the Alliance. Austin, who had worked in WCW and ECW but had found his greatest success in the WWF and was seen primarily as a WWF wrestler, was pushed as the leader of the Alliance and a more important player during the Invasion than the bona fide WCW or ECW members of the Alliance. Several top WCW and ECW talents who were top superstars in their previous companies, such as Diamond Dallas Page, Booker T, Rob Van Dam, The Dudley Boyz, Justin Credible, Raven and Tazz, were put down into low-mid card matches, while lesser-ranked WWF wrestlers who defected to the Alliance, such as Test, were given a greater push. Sting would cite this as the reason he would never sign with the WWF (until 2014) despite being offered a contract.

In the final Survivor Series main event between the WWF and the Alliance, the Alliance was represented by five wrestlers. Three of these were WWF wrestlers who had defected. Shane McMahon and Kurt Angle had never wrestled a match for WCW or ECW prior to the Invasion. Only three wrestlers who had worked in WCW or ECW, Austin, Booker T and Rob Van Dam, were on the team. McMahon, Booker T and Rob Van Dam were the first three wrestlers eliminated on the Alliance's team, resulting in the last survivors representing the ostensible WCW/ECW entity being two wrestlers who were already working for the WWF prior to the Invasion.

References 

2001 in professional wrestling
Extreme Championship Wrestling
History of WWE
World Championship Wrestling
WWE
Wrestling Observer Newsletter award winners